The Ferrovie dello Stato Italiane (FS; Italian State Railways) Class 650 (Italian: Gruppo 650), formerly SFAI 1181-1200 and Rete Mediterranea 300 Class, also known as "Vittorio Emanuele II", was the first steam locomotive in continental Europe to have the 4-6-0 'Ten-Wheeler' arrangement.

Design and construction
Designed by Cesare Frescot, the Class 650 was designed in light of the forthcoming opening (in 1889) of the new relief Giovi railway, which supplemented the old line opened in the 1850s and was less steep (1.6% maximum instead of 3.5%).

Previous fast locomotives were of the 4-4-0 arrangement; Frescot decided to add one more driving axle to ensure that the locomotive would be able to pull the increased loads without exceeding the axle load limits. He also discarded the Belpaire firebox, common in SFAI locomotive practice, for a round-top firebox, which would be a mainstay of Italian locomotive practice. The bogie had a small wheelbase, to keep the locomotive as short as possible.

The first locomotive was built in the SFAI's Turin works in 1884; the other fifty-four locomotives were built from 1887 to 1896: 36 by Ansaldo, thirteen by Maffei and five by Officine Miani & Silvestri.

Service and modifications
The first locomotive was the only one given a running number by the Società per le strade ferrate dell'Alta Italia, and was also the only one given a name ("Vittorio Emanuele II", in honour of King Victor Emmanuel II of Italy), as just as it was completed the transition between the SFAI and the Rete Mediterranea was being executed.

However, the steady increasing of the train's weight meant that these locomotives were gradually replaced by more powerful ones. The last locomotives of the Class 650 were withdrawn in the 1920s, with none surviving into preservation.

Some units of the class were rebuilt under the FS period with the boiler of the FS Class 656.

References

 
 
 

4-6-0 locomotives
650
Gio. Ansaldo & C. locomotives
Maffei locomotives
Railway locomotives introduced in 1884
Standard gauge locomotives of Italy
Rete Mediterranea steam locomotives 
Scrapped locomotives